Casualties in the Russo-Ukrainian War included six deaths during the 2014 annexation of Crimea by the Russian Federation, 14,200–14,400 military and civilian deaths during the war in Donbas (2014–2022), and tens of thousands of deaths during the 2022 Russian invasion of Ukraine.

Russian annexation of Crimea

During the Russian annexation of Crimea from 23 February through 19 March 2014, six people were killed. The dead included three protesters, two Ukrainian soldiers and one Russian Cossack paramilitary. On 10 August 2016, Russia accused the Special Forces of Ukraine of conducting a raid near the Crimean town of Armiansk which killed two Russian servicemen. The government of Ukraine dismissed the report as a provocation. Ten people were forcibly disappeared between 2014 and 2016 and were still missing as of 2017.

War in Donbas (before 2022 invasion)

The overall number of estimated deaths in the war in Donbas, from 6 April 2014 until 31 December 2021, was 14,200–14,400. This includes about 6,500 pro-Russian separatist forces, 4,400 Ukrainian forces, and 3,404 civilians. This number includes non-combat military deaths, as well as deaths from mines and unexploded ordnance. The vast majority of the deaths took place in the first year of the war, when major combat took place before the Minsk agreements.

Total deaths

Initially, the known number of Ukrainian military casualties varied widely due to the Ukrainian Army drastically understating its casualties, as reported by medics, activists and soldiers on the ground, as well as at least one lawmaker. Several medical officials reported they were overstretched due to the drastic number of casualties. Eventually, the Ukrainian Defence Ministry stated that the numbers recorded by the National Museum of Military History were the official ones, although still incomplete, with 4,647 deaths (4,509 identified and 138 unidentified) cataloged by 1 December 2021.

According to the Armed Forces of Ukraine, 1,175 of the Ukrainian servicemen died due to non-combat causes by 5 March 2021. Subsequently, the military did not publish new figures on their non-combat losses, stating they could be considered a state secret.

Deaths by regions

The following table does not include the 298 deaths from the shootdown of Malaysia Airlines Flight 17 or the deaths of Ukrainian servicemen, which are listed separately.

Missing and captured

At the beginning of June 2015, the Donetsk region's prosecutors reported 1,592 civilians had gone missing in government-controlled areas, of which 208 had been located. At the same time, a report by the United Nations stated 1,331–1,460 people were missing, including at least 378 soldiers and 216 civilians. 345 unidentified bodies, of mostly soldiers, were also confirmed to be held at morgues in the Dnipropetrovsk Oblast or buried. In all, as of late October, 774 people were missing according to the government, including 271 soldiers. By the end of December 2017, the number of confirmed missing on the Ukrainian side was 402, including 123 soldiers. The separatists also reported 433 missing on their side by mid-December 2016, and 321 missing by mid-February 2022.

As of mid-March 2015, according to the Security Service of Ukraine (SBU), 1,553 separatists had been released from captivity during prisoner exchanges between the two sides. Subsequently, Ukraine released another 322 people by late February 2016, while by September, 1,598 security forces members and 1,484 civilians had been released by the rebels. 1,110 separatist fighters and supporters, including 743 civilians, were reportedly still being held by Ukrainian forces as of late March 2016. The figure of separatist prisoners was updated to 816, including 287–646 civilians, in December. At the end of May 2015, the Ukrainian commander of Donetsk airport, Oleg Kuzminykh, who was captured during the battle for the complex, was released.

In December 2017, a large prisoner exchange took place where the rebels released 73 out of 176 prisoners they were holding, while Ukraine released 306 out of 380 of their prisoners. Out of those that were released by Ukraine, 29 brought to the exchange point refused to go back to separatist-held territory, while 40 who were already previously released did not show up for the exchange. Meanwhile, out of those released by the rebels, 32 were soldiers. This brought the overall number of prisoners released by the rebels to 3,215. Among those still held by the separatists, 74 were soldiers. The number of released prisoners was updated to 3,224 in late June 2018, while the number of those still held by the rebels was put at 113. At the end of December 2019, a new prisoner exchange took place, with Ukraine releasing 124 separatist fighters and their supporters, while 76 prisoners, including 12 soldiers, were returned to Ukraine by the rebels. Another five or six prisoners released by the separatists decided to stay in rebel-controlled territories.

Foreign fighters

Foreign volunteers have been involved in the conflict, fighting on both sides. The NGO Cargo 200 reported that they documented the deaths of 1,479 Russian citizens while fighting as part of the rebel forces. The United States Department of State estimated 400–500 of these were regular Russian soldiers. Two Kyrgyz and one Georgian have also been killed fighting on the separatist side. Additionally, at least 262 foreign-born Ukrainian citizens or foreigners died on the Ukrainian side. One of those killed was the former Chechen rebel commander Isa Munayev.

In late August 2015, according to a reported leak by a Russian news site, Business Life (Delovaya Zhizn), 2,000 Russian soldiers had been killed in Ukraine by 1 February 2015.

Foreign civilians and journalists

At least 306 foreign civilians were killed in the war in Donbas prior to the 2022 invasion:
 298 passengers and crew of Malaysia Airlines Flight 17
 Italian journalist Andrea Rocchelli and his Russian fixer and interpreter, activist Andrei Mironov
 Four other civilian journalists and media workers from Russia: Igor Kornelyuk and Anton Voloshin, a correspondent and sound engineer respectively; Anatoly Klyan, a camera operator; and Andrey Stenin, a photojournalist
 One Russian civilian killed in the shelling of Donetsk, Russia
 One Lithuanian diplomat

Landmines and other explosive remnants
As a consequence of the conflict, large swaths of the Donbas region have become contaminated with landmines and other explosive remnants of war (ERW). According to the UN Humanitarian Coordinator in Ukraine, in 2020 Ukraine was of one of the most mine-affected countries in the world, with nearly 1,200 mine/ERW casualties since the beginning of the conflict in 2014. A report by UNICEF released in December 2019 said that 172 children had been injured or killed due to landmines and other explosives.

2022 Russian invasion of Ukraine

Total casualties

On 21 September 2022, Russia's Ministry of Defence confirmed that 5,937 Russian soldiers had been killed in combat. It also claimed 61,207 Ukrainian soldiers had been killed and 49,368 wounded by this point.

According to BBC News Russian and the Mediazona news website, out of 17,375 Russian soldiers and contractors whose deaths they had documented by 16 March 2023, 10.6 percent (1,849) were officers, while 12 percent (2,077) were Motorized Rifle Troops and 9.3 percent (1,619) were members of the Russian Airborne Forces (VDV). In addition, 9.1 percent (1,583) of Russian soldiers whose deaths had been confirmed were people who were mobilized, while 12 percent (2,092) were convicts. The BBC further stated that "Every week, we discover new evidence of Russian military funerals in different localities of Russia, which were not reported by local authorities. Based on these observations, we can assume that the list of confirmed losses maintained by the BBC contain at least 40-60% fewer names of the dead than actually buried in Russia." Thus, the BBC stated that the actual death toll could be over 35,000, counting only Russian servicemen and contractors (i.e. excluding DPR/LPR militia). Mediazona added that "the real toll is likely in the tens of thousands."

According to an analysis by the Center of Strategic and International Studies (CSIS), Russia suffered more combat deaths in the first year of the war than in all of its wars since World War II combined, including the Soviet and Russian wars in Afghanistan and Chechnya. CSIS estimated Russia suffered an average of roughly 5,000 to 5,800 military fatalities per month over the first year of the war. In comparison, Russia suffered somewhere between 13,000 to 25,000 fatalities in Chechnya over a period of 15 years and the Soviet Union also suffered roughly 14,000 to 16,000 combat fatalities in Afghanistan. Thus, according to CSIS's analysis, the average rate of Russian fatalities per month over the first year of the conflict in Ukraine was at least 25 times more than in Chechnya and at least 35 times more than in the Soviet Union's war in Afghanistan.

Meanwhile, Ukraine confirmed its forces had suffered 10,000 killed and 30,000 wounded by the start of June 2022, while 7,200 troops were missing, including 5,600 captured. At the height of the fighting in May and June 2022, according to Ukrainian president Volodymyr Zelenskyy and presidential advisor Mykhailo Podolyak, between 100 and 200 Ukrainian soldiers were being killed in combat daily, while presidential adviser Oleksiy Arestovych stated 150 soldiers were being killed and 800 wounded daily. Mid-June, Davyd Arakhamia, Ukraine's chief negotiator with Russia, told Axios that between 200 and 500 Ukrainian soldiers were killed every day. By late July, Ukrainian daily losses fell to around 30 killed and about 250 wounded.

With respect to Russian military losses, Ukrainian estimates tended to be high, while Russian estimates of their own losses tended to be low. Combat deaths can be inferred from a variety of sources, including satellite imagery and video image of military actions. According to a researcher at the Department of Peace and Conflict Research at Uppsala University in Sweden, regarding Russian military losses, Ukraine's government was engaged in a misinformation campaign aimed to boost morale and Western media were generally happy to accept its claims, while Russia was "probably" downplaying its own casualties. Ukraine also tended to be quieter about its own military fatalities. According to BBC News, Ukrainian claims of Russian fatalities were including the injured as well. Analysts warned about accepting the Ukrainian claims as fact, as Western countries were emphasizing the Russian military's toll, while Russian news outlets have largely stopped reporting on the Russian death toll. In early June 2022, the Svetlogorsk City Court in the Kaliningrad region ruled that a list of Russian soldiers killed in Ukraine, published by privately owned news websites, constituted "classified information" and its publication could be considered a criminal offense.

The number of civilian and military deaths is impossible to determine with precision given the fog of war. The Office of the United Nations High Commissioner for Human Rights (OHCHR) considers the number of civilian casualties to be considerably higher than the one the United Nations are able to certify.

Civilian deaths
By December 2022, 19 of Ukraine's 24 oblasts had been documented by open-source intelligence to have civilian deaths. Additionally, Chernivtsi Oblast was the only region of Ukraine not to be attacked by Russian forces.

By 17 February 2023, the Ukrainian prosecutor general announced that at least 461 children had been killed since the start of the invasion, with a further 923 wounded. Most victims among children were from the Donetsk region. At least 55 of the war-related child deaths were from the Kyiv area and another 34 were from Kharkiv. According to Ukraine, 350 children have also been reported missing, and 16,222 deported, as of 6 February 2023. Russia reported that Ukrainian shelling of border areas in the Belgorod, Kursk and Bryansk Oblasts killed 30 people, while an alleged Ukrainian attack on drilling platforms in the Black Sea near Crimea reportedly left seven workers missing. In addition, due to missiles striking the Polish village of Przewodów in Lublin Voivodeship on 15 November 2022, two Polish civilians were killed.

Foreign civilians 
At least 44 civilian foreign citizens from 20 countries are confirmed to have been killed during the war.

Paul Urey and Dylan Healy, two British aid workers were captured by Russian forces, Healy was charged with 'forcible seizure of power' and undergoing 'terrorist' training, but later released on 22 September while Urey died in captivity. An American citizen was also detained by pro-Russian separatists forces and accused of 'participation in pro-Ukrainian protests'. He was released on 28 October, and reached Ukrainian-controlled territory by 14 December.

Foreign fighters and volunteers
Excluding the Russian and Ukrainian military casualties, at least 222 combatants and volunteers, foreign citizens or foreign-born, were killed during the war. By January 2023, another 1,000 had been wounded while fighting on the Ukrainian side. Below is a list of the nationalities of the foreign fighter casualties.

A Peruvian citizen was also reported missing while fighting alongside the Ukrainian military.

Identification and repatriation 
Sergiy Kyslytsya, the Ukrainian Ambassador to the United Nations, announced on 27 February 2022, that the country had reached out to the International Committee of the Red Cross for help in the repatriation effort of the bodies of killed Russian soldiers. Due to concerns that Russia was not reporting the number or any casualties of soldiers in Ukraine, the Ukrainian Interior Ministry began issuing appeals that same day for relatives of Russian soldiers to help identify wounded, captured, or killed soldiers. The initiative, called Ishchi Svoikh, appeared aimed in part at undermining morale and support for the war in Russia and was quickly blocked by the Russian government's media regulator the day the initiative began at the request of Russia's Prosecutor-General's Office.

Ukrainian authorities began using facial recognition technology supplied to them by Clearview AI on 12 March 2022, to help identify the deceased, along with potentially using it to uncover Russian spies, vet people at checkpoints and potentially combat misinformation. The Chief Executive of Clearview claimed that the technology could be more effective than matching fingerprints or other identifiable aspects of the individual, although a study by US Department of Energy highlighted the concern of decomposition reducing the effectiveness. Kyiv authorities have also reached out to the International Commission on Missing Persons, which was formed to help after the 1990s Balkan conflicts and the 1995 Srebrenica massacre, and identifies individuals by collecting DNA samples from the deceased and families to cross match. The organization will also document the location of the body and how the individual died.

As Russian soldiers began to retreat the identification of the dead civilians who had been unreported due to communication issues and constant fighting began to be reported. Documentation and identification of the bodies began with many hastily dug graves and rubble being cleared away to photograph and identify the bodies as well as count the number involved. Handwritten tags and passports have been attached to the bodies after identification before they are taken by coroners and officials. In some locations villagers kept track of the deceased, such as in Yahidne, a village north of Kyiv, where they used a school basement wall to write the names of the deceased while under Russian control.

As of late May 2022, Ukrainian authorities had stored at least 137 bodies of Russian soldiers that were collected near Kyiv, as well as 62 in the Kharkiv region. During June, the bodies of 374 Russian soldiers were exchanged for the bodies of 365 Ukrainian servicemen between Ukraine and Russia.

Notable deaths

Ukrainian military 

 On 24 February, Vitalii Skakun, a combat engineer, died during the Kherson offensive, reportedly sacrificing himself to ensure the destruction of a bridge to slow the Russian army's advance.
 On 25 February, Colonel Oleksandr Oksanchenko died in the Battle of Kyiv.
 On 25 February, Irina Tsvila, a Svoboda activist and soldier, was killed in Kyiv, along with her soldier husband.
 On 26 February, Inna Derusova, a military medic and nurse, was killed by enemy fire while taking care of wounded fellow soldiers.
 On 27 February, Sergeant Oleksiy Seniuk  was killed by Russian Armed Forces in the Siege of Chernihiv.
 On 1 March, Oleksandr Kulyk, an Olympic cycling coach, was killed in the battle near Nyzy in Sumy Oblast.
 On 2 March, Captain Oleksandr Korpan was killed in Starokostiantyniv, Khmelnytskyi.
 On 4 March, Valeriy Chybineyev, a sniper, was killed at the Battle of Antonov Airport.
 On 6 March, Pavlo Lee, an actor and member of the Territorial Defense Forces, was killed during the Kyiv offensive.
 On 7 March, Oleksandr Marchenko, a former member of the Ukrainian Parliament and member of Territorial Defense Forces was killed in a battle near Kyiv.
 On 8 March, Sergeant Kateryna Stupnytska from the 3rd Mechanised Battalion was killed in Kyiv. She was awarded with the Hero of Ukraine and the "Golden Star" Order.
 On 9 March, Colonel Serhiy Kotenko, Commander of the 9th Separate Motorized Infantry Battalion "Vinnytsa Scythians" was killed in battle near Zaparizhzhia.
 On 10 March, Yevhen Deidei, a former member of the Ukrainian Parliament, and deputy leader of Special Tasks Patrol Police Kyiv-1, was killed during the Battle of Kyiv in unknown circumstances.
 On 12 March, Colonel Dmytro Apukhtin, Deputy Commander of the 23rd Public Security Protection Brigade was killed near Mariupol during the attack of an enemy column.
 On 12 March, Colonel Valeriy Hudz, Commander of the 24th Mechanized Brigade was killed in Lugansk.
 On 13 March, Major Stephen Tarabalka, an Air Force pilot, was shot down and killed while fighting Russian forces. Tarabalka was hinted by Western media to be the Ghost of Kyiv.
 On 13 March, Aliaksiej Skoblia, Belarusian volunteer, member of Ukrainian Special Operations Forces and deputy Commander of Kastuś Kalinoŭski Battalion. Killed by Russian forces during an ambush in the outskirt of Kyiv.
 On 14 March, Mykola Kravchenko, a public and political figure, and the founder of the right-wing Azov Battalion, was killed during the Battle of Kyiv.
 On 25 March, Senior lieutenant Maxim Kagal was killed during the Battle of Mariupol. He was a kickboxing athlete and world champion in the national team of Ukraine; awarded posthumously Hero of Ukraine.
 On 1 April, Yuriy Ruf, a poet, was killed while fighting Russian forces in Luhansk.
 On 30 April, Ivan Bidnyak, a Silver medalist at the European Shooting Championships, was killed in action.
 On 9 June, Roman Ratushny, a Euromaidan activist and soldier, died during a battle near Izyum.
 On 12 June, Aleksey Chubashev, a military journalist and soldier, died during the Donbas offensive. Chubashev was the Chief of a Radio and a TV channel of the Ukrainian Ministry of Defense.
 On 19 June, Oleh Kutsyn, a political and military figure, died during battle in Izyum. Kutsyn was the head of the "Legion of Freedom" of the Svoboda party as well as Commander of company Karpatska Sich of the 93rd Mechanized Brigade of the Armed Forces of Ukraine.
 On 26 June, head of the Ukrainian Air Force 40th Tactical Aviation Brigade  colonel  Mykhailo Matyushenko was killed in dogfight over Black Sea.
 On 30 June, Thalita do Valle, a Brazilian model and actor, was killed by a missile strike, whilst fighting in Kharkiv.
 On 23 July, Colonel , Commander of the 28th Separate Mechanized Brigade died in Mykolaiv by an enemy airtrike.
 On 26 July, Major Oleksandr Kukurba, chief of Intelligence at the HQ of the 299th Tactical Aviation Brigade of the Armed Forces of Ukraine.
 On 3 September, Vyacheslav Nalivaiko, soldier and the Director of the military enterprise Ukrainian Armor was killed near Mykolayv.
 On 12 September, Oleksandr Shapoval, a ballet dancer and choreographer at the National Opera of Ukraine was killed in a battle near Donetsk.
 On 19 September, Major Andriy Nikolaychuk, Deputy Commander of the 93rd Mechanized Brigade, was killed in Kharkiv.
 On 27 September, a political scientist and Crimean Tatar historian and public figure, died fighting against Russian troops.
 On 28 September, Lieutenant Colonel , founder of the  died in Kharkiv when his vehicle was hit by a mine.
 On 3 November, Brigadier-General Artem Kotenko, deputy commander of the Ukrainian Air Assault Forces, who had commanded the 46th and the 81st Airmobile Brigade was killed in Zhytomyr when his vehicle was hit by a mine, the first Ukrainian General to be reportedly killed in the war.
 On 28 December, developer of S.T.A.L.K.E.R.: Clear Sky and Cossacks video game series, was reported killed in Bakhmut.
 On 6 March 2023, Major , battalion commander in the 80th Air Assault Brigade and a veteran of the 2014 war, was killed by a Russian airstrike in Chasiv Yar near Bakhmut.
 On 7 March 2023, Dmytro Kotsiubailo, leader of the Right Sector far-right paramilitary group, commander of the 1st Mechanized Battalion and Hero of Ukraine (2021), known by the nickname "Da Vinci", was killed in Bakhmut.

Ukrainian civilians and journalists 

 On 7 March, Mayor of Hostomel, Yuriy Prylypko, was killed by Russian forces.
 On 17 March, Artem Datsyshyn, a ballet dancer, died from injuries suffered on 26 February from Russian shelling in Kyiv.
 On 17 March, Yevhen Obedinsky, a member of the Ukrainian Olympic waterpolo team, died in the Siege of Mariupol.
 On 18 March, Borys Romanchenko, a Holocaust survivor, was killed in a shelling attack in Kharkiv.
 On 18 March, Oksana Shvets, an actress, died in a shelling attack on a Kyiv residential building.
 On 23 March, Mayor of Motyzhyn, Olga Sukhenko, was killed by Russian forces.
 On 31 March, Oleksiy Tsybko, a rugby union player, was killed by Russian forces.
 On 2 April, the Prosecutor General's office announced the death of Ukrainian photographer Maks Levin due to Russian small-arms fire. He had disappeared on 13 March.
 On 28 April, Vira Hyrych, a Ukrainian journalist, was killed by Russian shelling.
 On 29 April, the Mariupol City Council reported that Alina Peregudova, 14, who won gold at Ukraine's national weightlifting championship in 2021 and was on course to represent Ukraine at the Olympics, was killed in the Russian shelling of Mariupol. Her mother was also killed in the attack.
 On 30 April, Lyubov Panchenko, a fashion designer, died of starvation.
 On 31 July, Oleksiy Vadaturskyi, an agricultural and grain logistics businessman and the founder of Nibulon, the largest grain logistic company in Ukraine, was killed in the Russian shelling of Mykolaiv. His wife was also killed in the attack.
 On 14 January boxing coach Mykhailo Korenovsky and 44 others were killed during the 2023 Dnipro residential building airstrike.
 On 18 January 2023, multiple people were killed in a helicopter crash including
 Denys Monastyrsky, Minister of Internal Affairs
 Yevhen Yenin, Deputy Minister of Internal Affairs
 Yurii Lubkovych, State Secretary of Internal Affairs

Foreign civilians and journalists 

 On 13 March, Brent Renaud, an American journalist and documentarian, was killed by Russian forces.
 On 2 April, Mantas Kvedaravičius, a Lithuanian documentarian, was killed while fleeing the Siege of Mariupol.
 On 15 November, Polish civilians Bogusław Wos and Bogdan Ciupek, first instance of a citizens of a NATO member state dying on NATO territory during 2022 missile explosion in Poland in Przewodów, Poland

Russian and DPR/LPR military 

 On 4 March, Major general Andrei Sukhovetsky, deputy commander of the 41st Combined Arms Army, was killed in combat.
 On 5 March, Colonel Vladimir Zhoga, commander of the Sparta Battalion, was killed in Volnovakha.
 On 15 March, Ukrainian officials claimed Major general Oleg Mityaev, commander of the 150th Rifle Division, was killed in combat by the Azov Battalion.
 On 19–20 March, Russian officials confirmed that Captain 1st rank Andrei Paliy, a deputy commander of Russia's Black Sea Fleet, was killed in combat in Mariupol.
 On 25 March, Ukrainian officials claimed Lieutenant general Yakov Rezantsev, commander of Russia's 49th Combined Arms Army, was "most likely" killed as a result of Ukrainian strike on the command post of 49th Russian Army in Chornobaivka.
 On 15 April, Ukrainian officials claimed that Captain 1st Rank Anton Kuprin, the captain of the Moskva, was killed when the ship sank on 14 April.
 On 16 April, Russian officials said that Major General Vladimir Petrovich Frolov, Deputy Commander of the 8th Guards Army, was killed in combat in Ukraine, details were not provided.
 On 30 April, Ukrainian officials claimed that Major general Andrei Simonov, Chief of the Electronic Warfare Troops of the 2nd Army, was killed by Ukrainian forces near Izium.
 On 22 May, Major general Kanamat Botashev, was killed in the Luhansk region when his Su-25 was shot down by a FIM-92 Stinger missile.
 On 5 June, Lieutenant general Roman Kutuzov, Commander of the 1st Army Corps, Donetsk People's Republic People's Militia, was killed in Popasnyansky district, Luhansk.
 On 9 July, Colonel Alexey Gorobets, Commander of the 20th Guards Motor Rifle Division, was killed by a HIMARS attack in Kherson Oblast.
 On 29 July, Colonel Olga Kachura was killed by a missile strike in Horlivka.
 On 8 February 2023, Captain Igor Mangushev succumbed to his injuries after being shot in the back of the head while in Luhansk 4 days earlier.

Pro-Russian Ukrainian civilians 
 On 2 March, Volodymyr Struk, the mayor of Kreminna and a former member of the Ukrainian Parliament was found shot dead after being kidnapped.
 On 27 March, Oleksandr Rzhavskyy, a former member of the Ukrainian Parliament, was killed by Russian forces during the Bucha massacre.
 On 9 May, Davyd Zhvania, a former member of the Ukrainian Parliament and Emergency Minister of Ukraine, was killed by Russian forces.
 On 28 August, Oleksii Kovalov, a member of the Ukrainian Parliament, was shot dead during an attack at his place of residence.
 On 16 September, Sergei Gorenko, Prosecutor General of the Luhansk People's Republic, was killed in an explosion from an improvised explosive device in Luhansk.
 On 25 September, Oleksiy Zhuravko, a former member of the Ukrainian Parliament, died in a Ukrainian airstrike in Kherson during the Ukrainian southern counteroffensive.
 On 9 November, Kirill Stremousov, deputy head of the Russian administration in Kherson and pro-Russian social media personality, died in a car crash.

Prisoners of war

There have been many instances of troops being captured by both Ukrainian and Russian forces throughout the invasion.

Russia claimed to have captured 572 Ukrainian soldiers by 2 March 2022, while Ukraine claimed 562 Russian soldiers were being held as prisoners as of 20 March, with 10 previously reported released in prisoner exchanges for five Ukrainian soldiers and the mayor of Melitopol, Ivan Fedorov. Subsequently, the first large prisoner exchange took place on 24 March, when 10 Russian and 10 Ukrainian soldiers, as well as 11 Russian and 19 Ukrainian civilian sailors, were exchanged. Among the released Ukrainian soldiers was one of 13 Ukrainian border-guard members captured during the Russian attack on Snake Island. Later, on 1 April, 86 Ukrainian servicemen were exchanged for an unknown number of Russian troops.

On 8 March, a Ukrainian defense reporter with The Kyiv Independent announced that the Ukrainian government was working towards having Russian POWs help revive Ukraine's economy in full compliance with international law. Ukraine's ambassador to the U.S., Oksana Markarova, reported that a platoon of the 74th Guards Motor Rifle Brigade from Kemerovo Oblast surrendered to Ukraine, saying they "didn't know that they were brought to Ukraine to kill Ukrainians". Ukraine held a series of press conferences with about a dozen POW's, where the POW's made comments against the invasion, how they had been manipulated and for the conflict to end. While some have raised concerns that the conferences breach the Geneva Convention through potential unnecessary humiliation, US journalists who spoke to POW's independently of the conference claimed there was no intervention by Ukraine officials, by physical or mental coercion. According to The Guardian, while it was likely that Ukraine was using the discomfort of captured soldiers for propaganda purposes, still the videos succeeded in showing the Russian servicemen's "authentic sense" of regret for having come to Ukraine. Amnesty International argued that Article 13 of the Third Geneva Convention prohibits videos of captured soldiers. Captured Ukrainian soldiers with British citizenship were recorded calling for Boris Johnson to arrange for them to be freed in exchange for pro-Kremlin Ukrainian politician Viktor Medvedchuck. The videos were broadcast separately on Rossiya 24 TV channel, causing MP Robert Jenrick, to call the videos a "flagrant breach" of the Geneva Convention. A Russian spokeswoman claimed that she had also told Johnson during a phone call about the men's treatment that the UK should "show mercy" to the Ukrainian citizens by stopping military aid to the Ukrainian government when asked to show the men mercy.

On 11 March it was stated by the Ukrainian Defense Ministry that Russian armed forces were attempting to coerce Ukrainian POW's to fight for Russia in exchange for amnesty. The head of the Ukrainian Coordination Headquarters for POW Treatment, Iryna Vereshchuk, raised concerns that Russia had not released information to Ukrainian authorities on the location of any Ukrainian POW's and the International Red Cross had not been allowed to see them, as of 16 March.

By 21 April, Russia claimed that 1,478 Ukrainian troops had been captured during the course of the siege of Mariupol. On 22 April, Yuri Sirovatko, Minister of Justice of the Donetsk People's Republic, claimed that some 3,000 Ukrainian prisoners of war were held in the territory of the DPR. On 20 May, the Russian Ministry of Defense claimed that 2,439 Ukrainian soldiers had been taken prisoner over the previous five days as a result of the surrender of the last defenders of Mariupol, entrenched inside the Azovstal Iron and Steel Works. On 26 May, Rodion Miroshnik, ambassador of the Luhansk People's Republic to Russia, claimed that around 8,000 Ukrainian POWs were held within the territory of the DPR and LPR. According to a statement by Sergei Shoigu, Russia's Minister of Defence, in early June 2022, 6,489 Ukrainian soldiers had surrendered since the start of the Russian invasion of Ukraine.

In a report by The Independent on 9 June, it cited an intelligence report that more than 5,600 Ukrainian soldiers had been captured, while the number of Russian servicemen being held as prisoners had fallen to 550, from 900 in April, following several prisoner exchanges. In contrast, the Ukrayinska Pravda newspaper claimed 1,000 Russian soldiers were being held as prisoners as of 20 June.

According to Ukraine, as of 30 December 2022, 3,392 Ukrainian servicemen were being held by Russia as prisoners of war, while 15,000 soldiers and civilians were missing. The ICMP also stated a month earlier that 15,000 people were missing since the start of the Russian invasion. The following day, 31 December, 140 Ukrainian servicemen were released in a prisoner exchange, bringing the number of released prisoners from Russian captivity to 1,464 servicemen and 132 civilians. By 16 February, the number of prisoners released by Russia rose to 1,863.

See also
 Outline of the Russo-Ukrainian War
 The Wall of Remembrance of the Fallen for Ukraine
 Casualties during the 2013–2014 Ukraine crisis
 Military history of the Russian Federation
 List of people killed during the Revolution of Dignity

Notes

References

Ukrainian war casualties
War in Donbas
Russo-Ukrainian War